Mohammed Houmane Jarir (30 November 1944 – 19 May 2018) was a Moroccan footballer who played as a forward. He represented the Moroccan national team in the 1970 FIFA World Cup, scoring in their opening match against West Germany. He spent his club career with Raja CA Casablanca before a knee injury ended it.

International career

International goals

References

1944 births
2018 deaths
Footballers from Casablanca
Moroccan footballers
Morocco international footballers
Association football forwards
Raja CA players
Botola players
1970 FIFA World Cup players
Competitors at the 1967 Mediterranean Games
Mediterranean Games competitors for Morocco
Moroccan football managers
Raja CA managers
Botola managers